Kokatnur  is a village in the southern state of Karnataka, India. It is located in the Athni taluk of Belgaum district in Karnataka.

Demographics
 India census, Kokatnur had a population of 6,123 people with 3,124 males and 2,999 females.
Kannada is the official language. Marathi also spoken here

Notable people from Kokatnur 
 Vaman R. Kokatnur, American chemist

See also
 Belgaum
 Districts of Karnataka

References

External links
 http://Belgaum.nic.in/

Villages in Belagavi district